Stuart Leslie Devlin  (9 October 1931 – 12 April 2018) was an Australian artist and metalworker who specialised in gold and silver. He designed coins for countries around the world, and became especially well known as London-based designer of collectors' items in the 1970s and 1980s.

Devlin was born in Geelong, Victoria, Australia, and became an art teacher, specialising in gold and silversmithing. In 1957, he obtained a post at the Royal Melbourne Institute of Technology and studied for a Diploma of Art in gold and silversmithing. He was awarded scholarships to study at the Royal College of Art in London in 1958, and was awarded a Harkness Fellowship by the Commonwealth Fund. He spent the two-year fellowship at Columbia University in New York City where he met and married his first wife, Kim Hose, in 1962.

He returned to teach in Melbourne and subsequently became an inspector of art schools. He rose to fame when, in 1964, he won a competition to design the first decimal coinage for Australia.

In 1965, he moved to London and opened a small workshop. This marked the beginning of Devlin's own style, which often took the form of limited editions, the most popular being Easter eggs and Christmas boxes, now collectors' items. He adapted and devised new techniques to produce a wide variety of textures and filigree forms, and became well known in London's West End, producing a new collection each year. He had a prestigious showroom in Conduit Street from 1979 until 1985.

In 1966 a Stuart Devlin fine silver sculpture was commissioned by Ford of Britain to celebrate the release of the new Mk IV Ford Zephyr and Zodiac range of motor vehicles.

He has designed furniture, interiors, jewellery, and commissioned pieces of all types, including trophies, clocks, centrepieces, goblets, candelabra, bowls, and insignia. Among his most popular commissions, Devlin has designed coins and medals for 36 countries throughout the world, including precious coins for the Sydney 2000 Olympic Games and the medals for the founding awards of the Australian honours system in 1975: the Order of Australia, the Australian Bravery Decorations and the National Medal.

In 1982, Devlin was granted the Royal Warrant of Appointment as Goldsmith and Jeweller to Her Majesty the Queen. He married his second wife, Carole Hedley-Saunders, in 1986. He was Prime Warden of the Goldsmith's Company 1996–97.  After he stepped down from that role, he continued to work with the Goldsmiths, and particularly involved in the developing of a new institute for future Goldsmiths, and also with various other aspects which involve opportunities for up-and-coming jewellers and goldsmiths, including a summer school and 'getting started' course.

Having closed his London workshop, Devlin retired to Littlehampton, West Sussex. He ceased drawing after he suffered a stroke in 2014.

Devlin died on 12 April 2018 at the age of 86.

Honours
Devlin was appointed a Companion of the Order of St Michael and St George in the 1980 Birthday Honours for service to the art of design and an Officer of the Order of Australia in the 1988 Australia Day Honours in recognition of service to the craftsmanship as a goldsmith, silversmith and designer.

References

External links
 Profile at RMIT University

1931 births
2018 deaths
Australian silversmiths
Columbia University alumni
Harkness Fellows
RMIT University alumni
Australian expatriates in England
Australian designers
Goldsmiths
Australian Companions of the Order of St Michael and St George
Officers of the Order of Australia